MV Volgo-Balt 214 was a Panama-flagged Ukrainian general cargo ship, which sank in the Black Sea off the coast of Samsun, Turkey on 7 January 2019. Six of the thirteen crew members on board died while seven of them were rescued by the Turkish authorities and taken to hospital.

Characteristics
Volgo-Balt 214 was built as a Soviet-era general cargo ship in 1978. She sailed under the flag of Panama with home port Panama City.

History
The cargo vessel was carrying coal from the Russian port of Azov to the Turkish port of Samsun with eleven Ukrainian and two Azerbaijani crew members. After receiving a distress signal from the vessel at 08:10 local time (05:10 UTC), Turkish authorities launched a search and rescue operation with a plane, three helicopters and two boats. A helicopter of the Turkish Coast Guard arrived at the scene around  10:00 local time, and recovered two dead bodies rescuing seven survivors, who were taken to hospital. It was reported that the survivors were in good health. Four other dead bodies were later recovered from the sea. The captain was among the dead.

References

1978 ships
Merchant ships of Ukraine
Bulk carriers
Maritime incidents in 2019
Shipwrecks in the Black Sea
History of Samsun Province